The Grosse Pointe Yacht Club (GPYC) is a private yacht club located on the shore of Lake St. Clair in Grosse Pointe Shores, Michigan. The club is a member of the Detroit Regional Yacht-racing Association (DRYA). The clubhouse is prominently visible and a well-known landmark along the shoreline of the lake north of Detroit.

History

The club was initially founded as the Grosse Pointe Ice Boat Club in 1910 by Frank Verheyden. However, in 1918, the club was converted into the Grosse Pointe Yacht Club.

The Mediterranean Revival clubhouse was conceptualized by Boston architect Guy Lowell, who was commissioned in the 1920s to design the building. Lowell died at sea before his plans were fully developed, but his concept of the clubhouse was posthumously adopted for the club.

After several budgeting cutbacks and cost overruns, the clubhouse officially opened on July 4, 1929. The original clubhouse included a ball room and several dining rooms, with the largest being able to seat 250. However, increasing budget overruns left the clubhouse in debt during the Great Depression, causing it to foreclose despite attempts from the club to solicit more members. Several optimistic members purchased the club back from creditors during the beginning of World War II, as they predicted an increase in household spending power. 

In 1984, the board hired Charles Terrence McCafferty & Associates for $1,000,000 to redesign the dining and social facilities of the clubhouse. After a successful proposal, Edward V. Monahan, Inc. was contracted to build the expansions.

In 1997 the GPYC was named the “Number One Yacht Club in America” and is still considered among the best, earning "Club of Excellence" and "Distinguished Club" awards in consecutive years since 2019. The GPYC provides all the traditional amenities of a classic yacht club, including an Olympic-sized swimming pool, tennis and bowling facilities, as well as elegant dining rooms and a ballroom. Boating members enjoy the GPYC’s central location on Lake St. Clair and the club maintains a spacious deep-water marina with a private gas dock.

The GPYC maintains membership in the Detroit Regional Yachting Association and holds two annual DRYA-sanctioned sailing regattas each year in addition to numerous other sailing-related events and programs.

The bell tower serves as a navigational aid for boaters on the lake.

Clubhouse

Upon entering the club a 50-foot foyer leads to a rotunda which leads to points throughout the club. A bronze sculpture of Wheeler Williams, entitled "Rhythm of the Waves", is a prominent feature. Amenities of the club, besides the marina itself, include a bowling alley that is open year round, an Olympic-size pool, several clay tennis courts, two lighted paddle tennis courts, pickle ball courts and a sailing center.

The club includes 3 dining rooms, a main ballroom, six bars, a pool deck and two wine cellars. The club facilities have been updated and modernized several times. The harbor has been enlarged and improved as membership quadrupled. However, the architectural integrity of Lowell's original design and the views of Lake St. Clair have been maintained. A view of the club is shown as a background to the rolling credits at the end of the movie Gran Torino (2008) starring Clint Eastwood. as well as an aerial view of the   club's tower panning to encompass Lakeshore Dr. in a scene in the 1997 John Cusak film Grosse Pointe Blank.

See also

Grosse Pointe
St. Clair Shores

Notes

References

Further reading

External links

Yacht clubs in the United States
Buildings and structures in Wayne County, Michigan
Lake St. Clair
Clubhouses on the National Register of Historic Places in Michigan
National Register of Historic Places in Wayne County, Michigan
Coastal resorts in Michigan
Sailing in Michigan
Sports venues in Metro Detroit
Buildings and structures completed in 1914
1914 establishments in Michigan